E.T. the Extra-Terrestrial (or simply E.T.) is a 1982 American science fiction film produced and directed by Steven Spielberg and written by Melissa Mathison. It tells the story of Elliott, a boy who befriends an extraterrestrial, dubbed E.T., who is left behind on Earth. Along with his friends and family, Elliott must find a way to help E.T. find his way home. The film stars Dee Wallace, Henry Thomas, Peter Coyote, Robert MacNaughton and Drew Barrymore.

The film's concept was based on an imaginary friend that Spielberg created after his parents' divorce. In 1980, Spielberg met Mathison and developed a new story from the unrealized project Night Skies. In less than two months, Mathison wrote the first draft of the script, titled E.T. and Me, which went through two rewrites. The project was rejected by Columbia Pictures, who doubted its commercial potential. Universal Pictures eventually purchased the script for $1 million. Filming took place from September to December 1981 on a budget of $10.5 million. Unlike most films, E.T. was shot in rough chronological order to facilitate convincing emotional performances from the young cast. The animatronics for the film were designed by Carlo Rambaldi.

E.T. premiered as the closing film of the Cannes Film Festival on May 26, 1982, and was released in the United States on June 11, 1982. The film was an immediate blockbuster, surpassing Star Wars to become the highest-grossing film of all time, a record it held for eleven years until Spielberg's own Jurassic Park surpassed it in 1993. E.T. was widely acclaimed by critics, and is regarded as one of the greatest films of all time. It received nine nominations at the 55th Academy Awards, winning Best Original Score, Best Visual Effects, Best Sound, and Best Sound Editing, and also won five Saturn Awards and two Golden Globe Awards. The film was re-released in 1985 and again in 2002 to celebrate its 20th anniversary, with altered shots, visual effects, and additional scenes. It was also re-released in IMAX on August 12, 2022, to celebrate its 40th anniversary. In 1994, the film was added to the United States National Film Registry of the Library of Congress, who deemed it "culturally, historically, or aesthetically significant."

Plot 

Aliens secretly visit Earth at night to gather plant specimens in a California forest. One of them separates from the group, fascinated by the distant city lights. U.S. government vehicles arrive and chase the startled creature. The other aliens depart, abandoning him on Earth. In a nearby neighborhood in the San Fernando Valley, ten-year-old Elliott Taylor's suspicions are roused when he pitches a baseball into a tool shed, and the ball is rolled back. Later that night, Elliott returns with a flashlight, discovering the creature among the cornstalks. He shrieks and flees the scene.

Despite his family's disbelief, Elliott leaves a trail of candy to lure the alien into his house. Before bed, he realizes the alien is imitating his movements. The next morning, Elliott feigns sickness to stay home from school and play with him. He can "feel" the alien's thoughts and emotions, shown when the alien accidentally opens an umbrella, startling him and simultaneously Elliott several rooms away.

Later that day, Elliott introduces his older brother Michael and seven-year-old sister Gertie to the alien, deciding to keep him hidden from their mother, Mary. When the children ask the alien about his origins, he shows them by levitating several balls, representing his planetary system, and demonstrates his powers by reviving dead chrysanthemums. He demonstrates his healing power, through his glowing fingertip, on a minor cut on Elliott's finger.

At school the next day, Elliott begins to experience a much stronger empathic connection with the alien, including exhibiting signs of intoxication (because the alien is at Elliott's home, drinking beer and watching television) and freeing the frogs in his biology class. As the alien watches John Wayne kiss Maureen O'Hara in The Quiet Man on television, Elliott kisses a girl he likes similarly and is sent to the principal's office.

The alien dubs himself "E.T.", reading a comic strip where Buck Rogers, stranded, calls for help by building a makeshift communication device, and is inspired to try it himself. E.T. gets Elliott's help to build a device to "phone home" by using a Speak & Spell. Michael notices that E.T.'s health is declining and that Elliott is referring to himself as "we". Throughout this, the boys are unaware that E.T. is being tracked by government agents and that all three of them are being spied on.

On Halloween night, Michael and Elliott dress E.T. as a ghost to sneak him out. Elliott and E.T. head through the forest, where they successfully call home. The next day, Elliott wakes up in the field, finding E.T. gone. Elliott returns home to his worried family. Michael discovers E.T. dying next to a culvert and takes him home to an also-dying Elliott. Mary becomes horrified upon discovering her son's illness and the dying alien, just as a group of government agents dressed in biohazard suits led by "Keys" invades the house.

Scientists set up a lab at the house, asking Michael, Mary, and Gertie what they know about E.T. While the scientists are treating Elliott and E.T., the mental connection between Elliott and E.T. disappears. E.T. appears to die while Elliott recovers. Elliott is carried away, screaming that the doctors are killing E.T. as they try to revive him. When the doctors pronounce E.T. dead, Michael discovers that the chrysanthemums that E.T. previously revived are dying again. As Elliott recovers, the scientists first return him to his family, but then Keys leaves him alone with E.T. Elliott says a tearful goodbye, telling E.T. that he loves him before closing the case. Before long, E.T.'s heart light begins to glow, and Elliott notices that the chrysanthemum is once again coming back to life and opens the case. E.T. reanimates and tells Elliott that his people are returning.

Elliott and Michael steal the van that E.T. had been loaded into and a chase ensues, with Michael's friends joining them on bicycles, evading the authorities. Suddenly facing a police roadblock, E.T. helps them escape by using his telekinesis to lift them into the air just in time and towards the forest like he had done for Elliott before.

Standing near the spaceship, E.T.'s heart glows as he prepares to return home, while Mary, Gertie, and Keys show up. E.T. says goodbye to Michael and Gertie, as she presents him with the flower he had revived. Before boarding the spaceship, he embraces Elliott and tells him "I'll be right here", pointing his glowing finger to Elliott's forehead. He picks up the chrysanthemum and boards the spaceship. As the others watch it take off, the spaceship leaves a rainbow in the sky.

Cast

 Henry Thomas as Elliott Taylor, a 10-year-old boy who befriends E.T.
 Pat Welsh, Steven Spielberg, and Kayden Green as E.T. (voiceover; uncredited) 
 Dee Wallace as Mary Taylor, a single mother to Elliott, Michael and Gertie
 Peter Coyote as Keys, a government agent bent on capturing E.T.
 Robert MacNaughton as Michael Taylor, Elliott and Gertie's older brother
 Drew Barrymore as Gertie Taylor, Elliott and Michael's younger sister
 K.C. Martel as Greg
 C. Thomas Howell as Tyler
 Sean Frye as Steve
 Erika Eleniak as Pretty Girl
 David O'Dell as Schoolboy
 Richard Swingler as Science Teacher
 Frank Toth as Policeman
 Robert Barton as Ultra Sound Man
 Michael Darrell as Van Man
 Anne Lockhart as Nurse

Production

Development

After his parents' divorce in 1960, Spielberg filled the void with an imaginary alien companion that he later recalled as "a friend who could be the brother [he] never had and a father that [he] didn't feel [he] had anymore". In 1978, he announced that he would shoot a film entitled Growing Up, which he would film in four weeks. However, the project was set aside due to delays on 1941, but the concept of making a small autobiographical film about childhood would stay with him. He also thought about a follow-up to Close Encounters of the Third Kind, and began to develop a darker project he had planned with John Sayles called Night Skies, in which malevolent aliens terrorize a family.

Filming Raiders of the Lost Ark in Tunisia caused a sense of loneliness in Spielberg, far from his family and friends, and made memories of his childhood creation resurface. He told screenwriter Melissa Mathison about Night Skies, and developed a subplot from the failed project in which Buddy, the only friendly alien, befriends an autistic child. Buddy's abandonment on Earth in the script's final scene inspired the concept of E.T. Mathison wrote a first draft titled E.T. and Me in eight weeks, which Spielberg considered perfect. The script went through two more drafts, one by Matthew Robbins which deleted an "Eddie Haskell"–esque friend of Elliott's, named Lance. The chase sequence was also created, and he also suggested having the scene where E.T. got drunk.

In early summer 1981, while Raiders of the Lost Ark was being promoted, Columbia Pictures met with Spielberg to discuss the script, after having to develop Night Skies with the director as the intended sequel to Close Encounters of the Third Kind. However, Marvin Atonowsky, the head of Columbia Pictures' marketing and research development, concluded that it had a limited commercial potential, believing that it would appeal to mostly young children. John Veitch, president of the studio's worldwide productions, also felt that the script was not good or scary enough to draw enough crowd. On the advice of Atonowsky and Veitch, Columbia CEO Frank Price passed on the project, thus putting it in a turnaround, and Spielberg approached the more receptive Sid Sheinberg, president of MCA, then the parent of Universal Studios. Spielberg told Sheinberg to acquire the E.T. script from Columbia Pictures, which he did for $1million and struck a deal with Price in which Columbia would retain 5% of the film's net profits. Veitch later recalled that "I think [in 1982] we made more on that picture than we did on any of our films."

Pre-production

Carlo Rambaldi, who designed the aliens for Close Encounters of the Third Kind, was hired to design the animatronics for E.T. Rambaldi's own painting Women of Delta led him to give the creature a unique, extendable neck. Its face was inspired by those of Carl Sandburg, Albert Einstein and Ernest Hemingway. Producer Kathleen Kennedy visited the Jules Stein Eye Institute to study real and glass eyes. She hired Institute staffers to create E.T.'s eyes, which she felt were particularly important in engaging the audience. Four heads were created for filming, one as the main animatronic and the others for facial expressions, as well as a costume. A team of puppeteers controlled E.T.'s face with animatronics. Two little people, Tamara De Treaux and Pat Bilon, as well as 12-year-old Matthew DeMeritt, who was born without legs, took turns wearing the costume, depending on what scene was being filmed. DeMeritt actually walked on his hands and played all scenes where he walked awkwardly or fell over. The head was placed above that of the actors, and the actors could see through slits in its chest. Caprice Roth, a professional mime, filled prosthetics to play E.T.'s hands. The puppet was created in three months at the cost of $1.5million. Spielberg declared that it was "something that only a mother could love".

Mars, Incorporated refused to allow M&M's to be used in the film, believing that E.T. would frighten children. The Hershey Company was asked if Reese's Pieces could be used, and it agreed. This product placement resulted in a large increase in Reese's Pieces sales. Science and technology educator Henry Feinberg created E.T.'s communicator device.

Casting

Having worked with Cary Guffey on Close Encounters of the Third Kind, Spielberg felt confident in working with a cast composed mostly of child actors. For the role of Elliott, he auditioned hundreds of boys, including Keith Coogan; before Jack Fisk suggested Henry Thomas for the role because Henry had played the part of Harry in the film Raggedy Man, which Fisk had directed. Thomas, who auditioned in an Indiana Jones costume, did not perform well in the formal testing, but got the filmmakers' attention in an improvised scene. Thoughts of his dead dog inspired his convincing tears. Robert MacNaughton auditioned eight times to play Michael, sometimes with boys auditioning for Elliott. Spielberg felt that Drew Barrymore had the right imagination for mischievous Gertie after she impressed him with a story that she led a punk rock band. He enjoyed working with the children, and he later said that the experience made him feel ready to be a father. Ralph Macchio was considered for the role of Tyler, before it went to his eventual The Outsiders co-star C. Thomas Howell.

The major voice work of E.T. for the film was performed by Pat Welsh. She smoked two packs of cigarettes a day, which gave her voice a quality that sound effects creator Ben Burtt liked. She spent nine-and-a-half hours recording her part, and was paid $380 by Burtt for her services. He also recorded 16 other people and various animals to create E.T.'s "voice". These included Spielberg, actress Debra Winger, his sleeping wife sick with a cold, a burp from his USC film professor, raccoons, otters, and horses.

Doctors working at the USC Medical Center were recruited to play the ones who try to save E.T. after government agents take over Elliott's house. Spielberg felt that actors in the roles, performing lines of technical medical dialogue, would come across as unnatural. During post-production, he decided to cut a scene featuring Harrison Ford as the principal at Elliott's school. It featured his character reprimanding Elliott for his behavior in biology class and warning of the dangers of underage drinking. He is then taken aback as Elliott's chair rises from the floor, while E.T. is levitating his "phone" equipment up the stairs with Gertie. Ford's face is never seen. The footage of this scene has survived and was included on the film's 1996 laserdisc release as a bonus feature. It was not included on the DVD and Blu-ray releases that followed.

Filming
Principal photography began in neighborhoods in Los Angeles County and in the San Fernando Valley on September 8, 1981. The project was filmed under the cover name A Boy's Life, as Spielberg did not want anyone to discover and plagiarize the plot. The actors had to read the script behind closed doors, and everyone on set had to wear an ID card. The shoot began with two days at Culver City High School, and the crew spent the next 11 days moving between locations at Northridge and Tujunga. The next 42 days were spent at Laird International Studios in Culver City for the interiors of Elliott's home. The crew shot at a redwood forest near Crescent City in Northern California for the production's last six days. The exterior Halloween scene and the "flying bicycle" chase scenes were filmed in Porter Ranch.

Spielberg shot the film in roughly chronological order to achieve convincingly emotional performances from his cast; it was also done to help the child actors with the workload. Spielberg calculated that the film would hit home harder if the children were really saying goodbye to E.T. at the end. In the scene in which Michael first encounters E.T., his appearance caused MacNaughton to jump back and knock down the shelves behind him. The chronological shoot gave the young actors an emotional experience as they bonded with E.T., making the quarantine sequences more moving. Spielberg ensured that the puppeteers were kept away from the set to maintain the illusion of a real alien. For the first time in his career, Spielberg did not storyboard most of the film, in order to facilitate spontaneity in the performances. The film was shot so adults, except for Dee Wallace, are never seen from the waist up in its first half, as a tribute to the cartoons of Tex Avery. According to Spielberg, the scene in which E.T. disguises himself as a stuffed toy in Elliott's closet was suggested by fellow director Robert Zemeckis after he read a draft of the screenplay that Spielberg had sent him. In between takes, the young actors spent time doing activities such as riding bicycles around the sound stages, playing Dungeons & Dragons, the game that Elliott, Michael, Steve, Tyler and Greg play in a scene early in the film, and attending school lessons. The shoot was completed in 61 days, four ahead of schedule.

In a 2022 interview, Sean Frye, who played Steve, discussed the visual effect close-up shots for the climax of the "flying bicycle" chase scene: "We were on these rigs ... They're pulling the trees backwards, past us on tracks, so it looks like we're going through and up and through and over to create this illusion that we're going forward when we're going nowhere. Then the pushing and pulling of the things so that the bike is up and down, and we can get the 'Whoaaaa' effects. That was great." BMX riders Robert Cardoza, Greg Maes, David Lee, Grant Meyers, Chris Taylor, Duke Britton, Steve Williby and Bob Haro served as stunt doubles for the scene.

Music

Spielberg's regular collaborator John Williams, who composed the film's musical score, described the challenge of creating one that would generate sympathy for such an odd-looking creature. As with their previous collaborations, Spielberg liked every theme Williams composed and had it included. Spielberg loved the music for the final chase so much that he edited the sequence to suit it. Williams took a modernist approach, especially with his use of polytonality, which refers to the sound of two different keys played simultaneously. The Lydian mode can also be used in a polytonal way. Williams combined polytonality and the Lydian mode to express a mystic, dreamlike and heroic quality. His theme, emphasizing coloristic instruments such as the harp, piano, celesta, and other keyboards, as well as percussion, suggests E.T.'s childlike nature and his "machine". The soundtrack album was first released on June 11, 1982, the same day as the film. An audiobook companion album featuring Williams' score, produced by Quincy Jones and narrated by Michael Jackson, was released on November 15, 1982, the same month as Jackson's acclaimed sixth studio album Thriller.

Allegations of plagiarism
There were allegations that the film was plagiarized from The Alien, a 1967 script by Indian director Satyajit Ray, who stated, "E.T. would not have been possible without my script of The Alien being available throughout the United States in mimeographed copies." Spielberg denied this, stating "I was a kid in high school when his script was circulating in Hollywood." Star Weekend Magazine disputed Spielberg's claim, pointing out that he had graduated from high school in 1965 and began his career as a director in Hollywood in 1969. The Times of India noted that E.T. and Close Encounters of the Third Kind (1977) had "remarkable parallels" with The Alien, including the physical nature of the alien. In his screenplay, which Ray wrote entirely in English, he described the alien as "a cross between a gnome and a famished refugee child: large head, spindly limbs, a lean torso. Is it male or female or neuter? We don't know. What its form basically conveys is a kind of ethereal innocence, and it is difficult to associate either great evil or great power with it; yet a feeling of eeriness is there because of the resemblance to a sickly human child."

Ray first found out about E.T. from his friend, British science fiction writer Arthur C. Clarke, who was familiar with The Alien and believed it was plagiarized by E.T. Clarke called Ray and encouraged him to take legal action against E.T. No such legal action was taken, as Ray did not want to show himself as having a "vindictive" mindset against Spielberg, and acknowledged that he "has made good films and he is a good director".

In 1984, a federal appeals court ruled against playwright Lisa Litchfield, who sued Spielberg for $750 million, claiming he used her one-act musical play Lokey from Maldemar as the basis for E.T. She lost the case, with the court stating "No reasonable jury could conclude that Lokey and E.T. were substantially similar in their ideas and expression. Any similarities in plot exist only at the general level for which [Ms. Litchfield] cannot claim copyright protection."

Themes

Spielberg drew the story of the film from his parents' divorce. Gary Arnold of The Washington Post called it "essentially a spiritual autobiography, a portrait of the filmmaker as a typical suburban kid set apart by an uncommonly fervent, mystical imagination." References to Spielberg's childhood occur throughout: Elliott fakes illness by holding a thermometer to the bulb in his lamp while covering his face with a heating pad, a trick frequently employed by the young Spielberg. Michael picking on Elliott echoes Spielberg's teasing of his younger sisters, and Michael's evolution from tormentor to protector reflects how Spielberg had to take care of his sisters after their father left.

Critics have focused on the parallels between E.T.'s life and Elliott, who is "alienated" by the loss of his father. A. O. Scott of The New York Times wrote that while E.T. "is the more obvious and desperate foundling," Elliott "suffers in his own way from the want of a home." E.T. is the first and last letter of Elliott's name. At the film's heart is the theme of growing up. Critic Henry Sheehan described the film as a retelling of Peter Pan from the perspective of a Lost Boy (Elliott): E.T. cannot survive physically on Earth, as Pan could not survive emotionally in Neverland; government scientists take the place of Neverland's pirates. Furthering the parallels, there is a scene in the film where Mary reads Peter Pan to Gertie. Vincent Canby of The New York Times similarly observed that the film "freely recycles elements from" Peter Pan and The Wizard of Oz. Some critics have suggested that Spielberg's portrayal of suburbia is very dark, contrary to popular belief. According to A.O. Scott, "the suburban milieu, with its unsupervised children and unhappy parents, its broken toys and brand-name junk food, could have come out of a Raymond Carver story." Charles Taylor of Salon.com wrote that "Spielberg's movies, despite the way they're often characterized, are not Hollywood idealizations of families and the suburbs. The homes here bear what the cultural critic Karal Ann Marling called 'the marks of hard use'."

Other critics found religious parallels between E.T. and Jesus. Andrew Nigels described E.T.'s story as "crucifixion by military science" and "resurrection by love and faith." According to Spielberg biographer Joseph McBride, Universal Pictures appealed directly to the Christian market, with a poster reminiscent of Michelangelo's The Creation of Adam (more specifically the "fingers touching" detail) and a logo reading "Peace". Spielberg answered that he did not intend the film to be a religious parable, joking, "If I ever went to my mother and said, 'Mom, I've made this movie that's a Christian parable,' what do you think she'd say? She has a Kosher restaurant on Pico and Doheny in Los Angeles."

As a substantial body of criticism has built up around the film, numerous writers have analyzed it in other ways as well, interpreting it as a modern fairy tale and in psychoanalytic terms. Producer Kathleen Kennedy noted that an important theme of the film is tolerance, which would be central to future Spielberg films such as Schindler's List. Having been a loner as a teenager, Spielberg described it as "a minority story". Spielberg's characteristic theme of communication is partnered with the ideal of mutual understanding; he has suggested that the story's central alien-human friendship is an analogy for how real-world adversaries can learn to overcome their differences.

Reception

Release and sales
E.T. was previewed in Houston, Texas, where it received high marks from viewers. The film premiered at the 1982 Cannes Film Festival's closing gala on May 26, 1982, and was released in the United States on June 11, 1982. It opened at number one at the US box office with a gross of $11million, and stayed at the top of the box office for six weeks; it then fluctuated between the first and second positions until October, before returning to the top spot for the final time in December during a brief holiday season re-release. In its second weekend, it recorded the highest-grossing second weekend of all time, surpassing the record of $10,765,687 set by Superman II in 1981. In its fourth weekend, it recorded the highest-grossing weekend of all time, surpassing the record of $16,706,592 set earlier that year by Rocky III. It had a record eight weekends with a gross of over $10 million, a feat not matched until Home Alone (1990), and set a modern era record for being at number one for 16 weeks in total.

The film began its international rollout in Australia on November 26, 1982, and grossed $839,992 in its first 10 days from nine theatres, setting five weekly house records and 43 daily records. In South Africa, it opened in late November and grossed $724,340 in eight days from 14 screens, setting 13 weekly highs. In France, it opened on December 1, and had 930,000 admission in its first five days on 250 screens, setting an all-time record in Paris for most daily admissions (Saturday, December 4). In Japan, it opened on December 4, and grossed $1,757,527 in two days from 35 theatres in 11 cities, setting 10 house records on Saturday and 14 on Sunday. In the United Kingdom, it opened on December 9 after a charity performance in London and grossed a record £1 million in its opening weekend. The film added another 138 screens in Japan on December 11, with advance sales of 1.3 million tickets.

In 1983, E.T. surpassed Star Wars to become the highest-grossing film of all-time; by the end of its theatrical run, it had grossed $359million in the United States and Canada and $619million worldwide. Box Office Mojo estimates that the film sold over 120million tickets in its initial U.S. theatrical run. Spielberg earned $500,000 a day from his share of the profits, while The Hershey Company's profits rose 65% due to the film's prominent placement of Reese's Pieces. The "Official E.T. Fan Club" offered photographs, a newsletter that let readers "relive the film's unforgettable moments [and] favorite scenes", and a vinyl record with "phone home" and other sound clips. 

The film was also a merchandising success, with dolls selling  units by September 1982 and becoming the best-selling toy that Christmas season. Following the success of the film, Kuwahara, the company that created the BMX bikes featured in the film, began producing red and white "E.T." models in three price and quality levels. Kuwahara reissued the E.T. model in 2002, as part of the film's 20th anniversary, and again in 2022 as part of the film's 40th anniversary.

The film was re-released in 1985 and 2002, earning another $60million and $68million respectively, for a worldwide total of $792million with $435million from the United States and Canada. It held the global record until it was surpassed by Jurassic Park, another Spielberg-directed film, in 1993, although it managed to hold on to the United States and Canada record for a further four years, until the release of the Special Edition of Star Wars. 

It was re-released in IMAX on August 12, 2022, in the United States and Canada, to commemorate the film's 40th anniversary, alongside an IMAX and RealD 3D reissue of another Spielberg film Jaws scheduled for September 2. Jim Orr, Universal's president of distribution remarked "No filmmaker, it’s fair to say, has had a greater or more enduring impact on American cinema or has created more indelible cinematic memories for tens of billions of people worldwide. We couldn’t think of a more perfect way to celebrate the anniversary of E.T. and the first Universal-Spielberg summer blockbuster, Jaws, than to allow audiences to experience these films in a way they’ve never been able to before." The IMAX release grossed $490,000 on its first day from 389 theaters, for a three-day total of $1.07 million and a $438million running total.

Home media
E.T. was eventually released on VHS and laserdisc on October 27, 1988. The videos were priced with a recommended retail price of $24.95, the lowest initial price at the time for a major movie compared to the normal price of $89.95. To combat piracy, the tapeguards and tape hubs on the videocassettes were colored green, and the tape itself was affixed with a small, holographic sticker of the 1963 Universal logo (much like the holograms on a credit card), and encoded with Macrovision. The VHS cassette was also rented over six million times during its first two weeks in 1988, a record it held until the VHS release of Batman the following year. Initial orders internationally exceeded $30 million despite the film often being sold at full price, setting records in the United Kingdom with over 81,000 units and Australia with 35,500 units. It initially shipped 152,000 units in Japan and 87,000 in Germany. In 1991, Sears began selling E.T. videocassettes exclusively at their stores as part of a holiday promotion. It was reissued on VHS and Laserdisc again in 1996, with the latter including a 90-minute documentary produced and directed by Laurent Bouzereau; it included interviews with Spielberg, producer Kathleen Kennedy, composer John Williams, and other cast and crew members, as well as two theatrical trailers, an isolated music score, deleted scenes, and still galleries. The VHS included a 10-minute version of the same documentary from the Laserdisc. The 2012 release of E.T. on DVD and Blu-ray grossed  in sales revenue  in the United States.

Critical response

E.T. the Extra-Terrestrial received universal acclaim. Roger Ebert gave the film four out of four stars and wrote, "This is not simply a good movie. It is one of those movies that brush away our cautions and win our hearts." He later added it to his "Great Movies" list, structuring the essay as a letter to his grandchildren about the first time they watched it. Michael Sragow of Rolling Stone called Spielberg "a space age Jean Renoir.... for the first time, [he] has put his breathtaking technical skills at the service of his deepest feelings". Derek Malcolm of The Guardian wrote that "E.T. is a superlative piece of popular cinema [...] a dream of childhood, brilliantly orchestrated to involve not only children but anyone able to remember being one". Leonard Maltin included it in his list of "100 Must-See Films of the 20th Century" as one of only two movies from the 1980s. Political commentator George Will was one of few to pan the film, feeling it spread subversive notions about childhood and science.

The film holds a 99% "Certified Fresh" approval rating on Rotten Tomatoes, based on 136 reviews, and an average rating of 9.3/10. The website's critical consensus reads: "Playing as both an exciting sci-fi adventure and a remarkable portrait of childhood, Steven Spielberg's touching tale of a homesick alien remains a piece of movie magic for young and old." On Metacritic, it has a weighted average score of 91/100 based on 30 reviews, indicating "universal acclaim". In addition to the film's wide acclaim, President Ronald Reagan and First Lady Nancy Reagan were moved by it after a screening at the White House on June 27, 1982. Princess Diana was in tears after watching it. On September 17, 1982, it was screened at the United Nations, and Spielberg received a UN Peace Medal. CinemaScore reported that audiences polled during the opening weekend gave the film a rare "A+" grade, the first known film to earn that grade.

Accolades

The film was nominated for nine Oscars at the 55th Academy Awards, including Best Picture. Gandhi won that award, but its director, Richard Attenborough, said, "I was certain that not only would E.T. win, but that it should win. It was inventive, powerful, wonderful. I make more mundane movies." E.T. won four Academy Awards: Best Original Score, Best Sound (Robert Knudson, Robert Glass, Don Digirolamo, and Gene Cantamessa), Best Sound Effects Editing (Charles L. Campbell and Ben Burtt), and Best Visual Effects (Carlo Rambaldi, Dennis Muren, and Kenneth F. Smith). At the 40th Golden Globe Awards, the film won Best Picture in the Drama category and Best Original Score; it was also nominated for Best Director, Best Screenplay, and Best New Male Star for Henry Thomas. The Los Angeles Film Critics Association awarded the film Best Picture, Best Director, and a "New Generation Award" for Melissa Mathison. The film won Saturn Awards for Best Science Fiction Film, Best Writing, Best Special Effects, Best Music, and Best Poster Art, while Henry Thomas, Robert McNaughton, and Drew Barrymore won Young Artist Awards. In addition to his Academy, Golden Globe and Saturn, composer John Williams won two Grammy Awards and a BAFTA for the score. The film's audiobook album also won the Grammy Award for Best Recording for Children at the 26th Annual Grammy Awards in 1984.

Legacy
In American Film Institute polls, the film has been voted the 24th greatest film of all time, the 44th most heart-pounding, and the sixth most inspiring. Other AFI polls rated it as having the 14th greatest music score and as the third greatest science-fiction one. The line "E.T. phone home" was ranked 15th on AFI's 100 Years...100 Movie Quotes list, and 48th on Premiere top movie quote list. In 2005, it topped a Channel 4 poll in the UK of the 100 greatest family films, and was listed by Time as one of the 100 best movies ever made.

In 2003, Entertainment Weekly called the film the eighth most "tear-jerking"; in 2007, in a survey of both films and television series, the magazine declared it the seventh greatest work of science-fiction media in the past 25 years. The Times also named it as their ninth favorite alien in a film, calling it "one of the best-loved non-humans in popular culture". It is among the top ten in the BFI list of the 50 films you should see by the age of 14. In 1994, it was selected for preservation in the U.S. National Film Registry as being "culturally, historically, or aesthetically significant". In 2011, ABC aired Best in Film: The Greatest Movies of Our Time, revealing the results of a poll of fans conducted by ABC and People magazine: It was selected as the fifth best film of all time and the second best science fiction film. On October 22, 2012, Madame Tussauds unveiled wax likenesses of E.T. at six of its international locations.

20th anniversary version

An extended version of the film, dubbed the "Special Edition" (currently out of circulation), including altered dialogue and visual effects, premiered at the Shrine Auditorium in Los Angeles on March 16, 2002; it was released on home media six days later. Certain shots of E.T. had bothered Spielberg since 1982, as he did not have enough time to perfect the animatronics. Computer-generated imagery (CGI), provided by Industrial Light & Magic (ILM), was used to modify several shots, including ones of E.T. running in the opening sequence and being spotted in the cornfield. The spaceship's design was also altered to include more lights. The first flying sequence where Elliott and E.T. fly on their bicycle through the forest now had the cape of Elliott's Halloween costume flap in the wind as it appeared to have originally been intended to be, a change done to have the sequence, particularly the iconic shot of them flying past the moon, match the film's poster and the logo of Spielberg's production company Amblin Entertainment. Scenes shot for but not included in the original version were introduced. These included E.T. taking a bath and Gertie telling Mary that Elliott went to the forest on Halloween. Mary's dialogue, during the offscreen argument with Michael about his Halloween costume, was altered to replace the word "terrorist" with "hippie". Spielberg did not add the scene featuring Harrison Ford, feeling that would reshape the film too drastically. He became more sensitive about the scene where gun-wielding federal agents confront Elliott and his escaping friends and had them digitally replaced with walkie-talkies.

At the premiere, John Williams conducted a live performance of the score. The new release grossed $68million in total, with $35million coming from Canada and the United States. The changes to it, particularly the escape scene, were criticized as political correctness. Peter Travers of Rolling Stone wondered "Remember those guns the feds carried? Thanks to the miracle of digital, they're now brandishing walkie-talkies.... Is this what two decades have done to free speech?" Chris Hewitt of Empire wrote, "The changes are surprisingly low-key... while ILM's CGI E.T. is used sparingly as a complement to Carlo Rambaldi's extraordinary puppet." South Park ridiculed many of the changes in the 2002 episode "Free Hat".

The two-disc DVD release which followed on October 22, 2002, contained the original theatrical and 20th Anniversary extended versions of the film. The features on disc one included an introduction with Steven Spielberg, a 20th Anniversary premiere featurette, John Williams' performance at the 2002 premiere, and a Space Exploration game. Disc two included a 24-minute documentary about the 20th Anniversary edition changes, a "Reunion" featurette, a trailer, cast and filmmaker bios, production notes, and the still galleries ported from the 1996 LaserDisc set. The two-disc edition, as well as a three-disc collector's edition containing a "making of" book, a certificate of authenticity, a film cell, and special features that were unavailable on the two-disc edition, were placed in moratorium on December 31, 2002. Later, it was re-released on DVD as a single-disc re-issue in 2005, featuring only the 20th Anniversary version.

In a June 2011, interview, Spielberg said

[In the future,] ... There's going to be no more digital enhancements or digital additions to anything based on any film I direct.... When people ask me which E.T. they should look at, I always tell them to look at the original 1982 E.T. If you notice, when we did put out E.T. we put out two E.T.s. We put out the digitally enhanced version with the additional scenes and for no extra money, in the same package, we put out the original '82 version. I always tell people to go back to the '82 version.

For the film's 30th anniversary release on Blu-ray in 2012, and for its 35th anniversary release on Ultra HD Blu-ray in 2017, as well as its corresponding digital releases; only the original theatrical edition was released, with the 20th anniversary edition now out of circulation.

Other portrayals

Atari, Inc. produced a video game based on the film for the Atari 2600 and hired Howard Scott Warshaw to program the game. The game was rushed in five weeks to release within the 1982 holiday season. Released in Christmas 1982, the game was critically panned, with nearly every aspect of the game facing heavy criticism. It has since been considered to be one of the worst video games ever made. It was also a commercial failure. It has been cited as a major contributing factor to the video game industry crash of 1983, and has been frequently referenced and mocked in popular culture as a cautionary tale about the dangers of rushed game development and studio interference. In what was initially deemed an urban legend, reports from 1983 stated that as a result of overproduction and returns, millions of unsold cartridges were secretly buried in an Alamogordo, New Mexico landfill and covered with a layer of concrete. In April 2014, diggers hired to investigate the claim confirmed that the Alamogordo landfill contained many E.T. cartridges, among other games.

William Kotzwinkle, author of the film's novelization, wrote a sequel, E.T.: The Book of the Green Planet, which was published in 1985. In the novel, E.T. returns home to the planet Brodo Asogi, but is subsequently demoted and sent into exile. He attempts to return to Earth by effectively breaking all of Brodo Asogi's laws.

In the 1982 painting Yalta Conference, Soviet conceptual artists Komar and Melamid depict E.T. in FDR's outfit along with Stalin in a military uniform and Hitler looming from behind their backs. Boris Groys links this image to a "post-utopian" sentiment of the Sots Art, as opposed to anti-utopian message of the pop art, which also makes use of totalitarian images and pop culture icons in an interchangeable way, but robs them of the transformational utopian message.

E.T. Adventure, a theme park ride based on the film and drawing inspiration from The Book of the Green Planet, debuted at Universal Studios Florida on June 7, 1990. The $40million attraction features the title character saying goodbye to visitors by name, along with his home planet. In 1998, E.T. was licensed to appear in television public service announcements produced by the Progressive Corporation. The announcements featured his voice reminding drivers to "buckle up" their seat belts. Traffic signs depicting a stylized E.T. wearing one were installed on selected roads around the United States. The following year, British Telecommunications launched the "Stay in Touch" campaign, with him as the star of various advertisements. The campaign's slogan was "B.T. has E.T.", with "E.T." also taken to mean "extra technology".

At Spielberg's suggestion, George Lucas included members of E.T.'s species as background characters in Star Wars: Episode I – The Phantom Menace. E.T. was one of the franchises featured in the 2015 crossover game Lego Dimensions. E.T. appears as one of the playable characters, and a world based on the film where players can receive side quests from the characters is available. During E.T.’s trailer in the sketch for the series known as Meet that Hero!, Supergirl explains his backstory and how they have many things in common, including being aliens that crashed down to Earth and how they both have superpowers that they use to help other people. In 2017, video game developer Zen Studios released a pinball adaptation as part of the Universal Classics add-on pack for the virtual pinball game Pinball FX 3. It features 3-D animated figures of Elliot, E.T. and his spacecraft.

In the 2022 film Chip 'n Dale: Rescue Rangers, a character is shown watching a film called Batman vs. E.T., in which E.T. is shown meeting and fighting Batman. A billboard for Batman vs. E.T. was also shown in the film.

Sequels

Cancelled feature length sequel 
In July 1982, during the film's first theatrical run, Spielberg and Mathison wrote a treatment for a sequel to be titled E.T. II: Nocturnal Fears. It would have shown Elliott and his friends getting kidnapped by evil aliens, and attempting to contact E.T. for help. Spielberg decided against pursuing it, feeling it "would do nothing but rob the original of its virginity. E.T. is not about going back to the planet". However, on June 28, 2022, Henry Thomas said that he hopes a feature-length sequel never gets made, but added "I guarantee you, there are a few men in a very big room now salivating and using their Abacus and slide rules to come up with some really, really big numbers."

Short film sequel 

On November 28, 2019, during NBC's broadcast of the 93rd Macy's Thanksgiving Day Parade, Xfinity released a four-minute commercial directed by Lance Acord, calling it a "short film sequel" to the original film, titled A Holiday Reunion. The commercial stars Henry Thomas, reprising his role as Elliott, now an adult with a family of his own. Julianne Hoyak played his wife, Grace, while Zebastin Borjeau and Alivia Drews played their children, Elliott Jr. and Maggie. The story follows E.T. as he returns to Earth for the holiday season, and focuses on the importance of bringing family together. References and nods to the original film are featured, such as a photo of the Taylors' family dog Harvey on the kitchen fridge and a replica of the makeshift Speak & Spell communication device.

The commercial utilizes a practical puppet for E.T. himself. In an interview with Deadline, Accord said that he went this route in order to elicit more realistic performances from the actors, the same way Spielberg did on the original film. John Williams' score from the original film is mixed into the commercial. Spielberg was consulted by Comcast (parent company of NBCUniversal, which itself owns Universal Pictures) before production on the commercial began.

Peter Intermaggio, SVP for Marketing Communications for Comcast remarked on the making of the commercial: "Our goal is to show how Xfinity and Sky technology connects family, friends and loved ones, which is so important during the holidays ... The classic friendship between E.T. and Elliott resonates around the world." Before the commercial was released, Thomas assured that viewers would "get everything they want out of a sequel without the messy bits that could destroy the beauty of the original and the special place it has in people’s minds and hearts ... Looking at the storyboards, I could see exactly why Steven was really behind it, because the integrity of the story isn’t lost in this retelling."

The full commercial also played on Syfy and theatrically during cinema pre-shows through January 5, 2020, and a two–minute version was edited for Comcast's British subsidiary, Sky UK.

See also
 The Alien (unproduced film)

Notes

References

Bibliography

External links

 
 
 
 
 
 
 
 E.T. The Extra-Terrestrial essay by Dave Gibson on the National Film Registry website 
 E.T. The Extra-Terrestrial essay by Daniel Eagan in America's Film Legacy: The Authoritative Guide to the Landmark Movies in the National Film Registry, A&C Black, 2010 , pages 774–775 America's Film Legacy: The Authoritative Guide to the Landmark Movies in the National Film Registry

 
1982 films
1980s coming-of-age films
1980s science fiction films
Alien visitations in films
Amblin Entertainment films
American coming-of-age films
American science fiction adventure films
Best Drama Picture Golden Globe winners
Children's science fiction films
Films about friendship
Films about telekinesis
Films about dysfunctional families
Films about telepathy
Films about divorce
Films with screenplays by Melissa Mathison
Films directed by Steven Spielberg
Films involved in plagiarism controversies
Films produced by Kathleen Kennedy
Films produced by Steven Spielberg
Films scored by John Williams
Films set in 1982
Films about extraterrestrial life
Films set in the San Fernando Valley
Films shot in Los Angeles
Films that won the Best Original Score Academy Award
Films that won the Best Sound Editing Academy Award
Films that won the Best Sound Mixing Academy Award
Films that won the Best Visual Effects Academy Award
IMAX films
Films about mother–son relationships
United States National Film Registry films
Universal Pictures films
American children's adventure films
1980s English-language films
1980s American films